The Little River is an  tributary of the Presumpscot River in the U.S. state of Maine. It rises in the northern part of the town of Buxton in York County and flows southeast, then northeast into Gorham in Cumberland County.  It flows northeast and east across Gorham, reaching the Presumpscot at the eastern boundary of the town, across from Windham.

See also
List of rivers of Maine

References

Maine Streamflow Data from the USGS
Maine Watershed Data From Environmental Protection Agency

Rivers of York County, Maine
Rivers of Cumberland County, Maine
Buxton, Maine
Gorham, Maine
Windham, Maine
Rivers of Maine